Jose Sanabria (born February 16, 1963 in Morón, Venezuela) is a former boxer from Venezuela. He was the IBF super bantamweight champion.

Professional career

Sanabria turned professional in 1984 & amassed a record of 12-2-2 before unsuccessfully challenging South Korean boxer Lee Seung-hoon, for the IBF super bantamweight title. Sanabria would go on to challenge for the same title in his next fight & this time win via TKO. He made his first defense against Italy's Vincenzo Belcastro.

Professional boxing record

See also
List of world super-bantamweight boxing champions

References

External links

 

|-

1963 births
Living people
Venezuelan male boxers
Venezuelan expatriate sportspeople in the United States
Super-bantamweight boxers
World super-bantamweight boxing champions
International Boxing Federation champions